Kanjavely is a  village in the Thrikkaruva panchayat of Kollam district in Kerala, India.

References 

Villages in Kollam district